The Tallinn Open is a tennis event held in Tallinn, Estonia. The first edition took place in October 2022. Tallinn Open is part of the WTA Tour and is listed as a WTA 250 tournament. The tournament was introduced in 2022 as a result of cancellation of WTA events in China due to the Peng Shuai sexual assault and disappearance controversy. Estonia's top ranked player Anett Kontaveit played a major role in bringing the WTA event to Estonia after facing political resistance.

The tournament is held at the FORUS Tennis Center on indoor hardcourts.

Past finals

Singles

Doubles

See also
Baltic Open

References

WTA Tour
Tennis tournaments in Estonia
Hard court tennis tournaments